Anguish refers to extreme pain, distress or anxiety.

Anguish may also refer to:
 Anguish (1917 film), a French silent film
 Anguish (1947 film), a Spanish crime film
 Anguish (1987 film), a Spanish-produced horror film
 Anguish (2015 film), an American horror film
 Anguish, the most famous painting of painter August Friedrich Schenck